Callisphecia is a genus of moths in the family Sesiidae.

Species
Callisphecia bicincta Le Cerf, 1916
Callisphecia oberthueri Le Cerf, 1916

References

Sesiidae